Maurice Lagrenée (1 July 1893 - 23 May 1955) was a French film actor.

Lagrenée was born Maurice-Jules Guichard in Sivry-Courtry and died in Paris at age 61.

Selected filmography
 Jean Chouan (1926)
 The Champion Cook (1932)
 The Night at the Hotel (1932)
 Inspecteur Grey (1936)
 Vidocq (1939)
 Les mutinés de l'Elseneur (1936)
 Pamela (1945)
 The Faceless Enemy (1946)
 Monelle (1948)
 Maître après Dieu (1951)

References

External links

1893 births
1955 deaths
French male film actors
French male silent film actors
People from Seine-et-Marne
20th-century French male actors